BNI may refer to:

Organizations
 Banco Nacional de Investimento, the national development bank of Mozambique
 Bank Negara Indonesia
 Bureau of National Investigations, the external and internal intelligence agency of Ghana
 Burlington Northern Santa Fe Corporation, by NYSE ticker code
 Burma News International, a Burmese news network
 Barrow Neurological Institute, a US neurological disease treatment and research institution
 Business Network International, the business networking organization

Transportation
 Barnes Bridge railway station, by National Rail station code
 Britten-Norman Islander, a two engine aircraft
 Nikolassee railway station, by DB station code
 Benin Airport, by IATA code

Other uses
 Bankruptcy Navigator Index
 British Nursing Index, a bibliographic database for nursing and midwifery literature